Beverly Mae Brine (born June 19, 1961) is an investment counsellor and former political figure in New Brunswick, Canada. She represented Albert in the Legislative Assembly of New Brunswick as a Confederation of Regions member from 1991 to 1994 and as an independent from 1994 to 1995.

She was born in Moncton, New Brunswick and educated there. After disputing Danny Cameron's leadership of the party, both Brine and colleague Brent Taylor left the Confederation of Regions caucus in 1994 and did not run for reelection in 1995.

References 
 List of Women MLAs, New Brunswick Legislative Library

1961 births
Independent New Brunswick MLAs
Living people
New Brunswick Confederation of Regions Party MLAs
People from Moncton
Women MLAs in New Brunswick